The 1966 New York gubernatorial election was held on November 8, 1966 to elect the Governor and Lieutenant Governor of New York. Incumbent Republican Nelson Rockefeller won reelection. As of 2022, this is the last time Manhattan (New York County) voted for a Republican in a statewide election.

Contested nominations

Conservative

Democratic

Liberal

Results

References

1966
Gubernatorial
New York
November 1966 events in the United States
Nelson A. Rockefeller